The Woman Next Door is a lost 1915 silent film drama directed by Walter Edwin and starring Irene Fenwick.

Cast
Irene Fenwick - Jenny Gay
Richie Ling - Ben Whittier
Lawson Butt - Jack Lake
Ben Taggart - Tom Grayson
Della Connor - Cecilia Grayson
Camilla Dalberg - Mrs. Grayson
Albert Andruss - Judge Grayson
John Nicholson - The Mexican Commandante
William Bechtel -

References

External links
The Woman Next Door @ IMDb.com

1915 films
American silent feature films
American films based on plays
Lost American films
1915 drama films
American black-and-white films
Silent American drama films
1915 lost films
Lost drama films
1910s American films